Intent to Kill is a 1958 British film noir thriller directed by Jack Cardiff and starring Richard Todd, Betsy Drake and Herbert Lom.  The film was based on the 1957 novel of the same name by Brian Moore (written under the pen-name Michael Bryan).  It was shot on location in Montreal, Quebec, Canada, with an international cast of European and North American actors.

Plot
Having previously survived an assassination attempt, Juan Menda (Lom), president of an unspecified South American country, is moved to Montreal under an anonymous pseudonym for treatment of a potentially fatal cranial blood clot.  His political opponents have got wind of his whereabouts and hire a trio of Canadian hitmen to finish the job.  Menda's aide Francisco (Carlo Giustini) is also in town, and unknown to Menda he is actually a prime-mover in the assassination plot, keeping close to Menda while duplicitously passing on information to the would-be killers.  Not only is Francisco an unsuspected political arch-rival, but he is also keeping an eye on Menda's glamorous wife Carla (Lisa Gastoni), with whom he fancies his chances once Menda is out of the way.

Meanwhile, British surgeon Bob McLaurin (Todd) is under pressure from nagging, dissatisfied wife Margaret (Catherine Boyle), who wants him to give up his job in Canada and move back to London to open a private cosmetic surgery for the wealthy, where he could at least double his income.  Margaret claims to know of an (imaginary) affair of Bob with fellow surgeon Nancy Ferguson (Drake), and is threatening to go public with the information.  The worry causes Bob to lose concentration during Menda's operation, and he almost makes a fatal slip-up.  However, in the end the operation is a complete success.

As Menda recovers, he grows uneasy about Carla's apparent lack of interest as she makes no effort to visit.  He also starts to suspect that there is more to Francisco than meets the eye.  Eventually he comes to the conclusion that the two of them are in league in some way or another, at best to dally romantically behind his back, at worst to be working with his enemies to plot his demise.  Fearing for his safety, he demands to be moved to a different hospital room.

The hitmen make their move on what they believe to be Menda's room, only to find they have killed a completely innocent man in the hospital for surgery on a slipped disc.  Bob, Nancy and the police all believe the unfortunate dead man was mistaken for Menda, and a policeman is detailed to provide Menda with a 24-hour guard until he is ready to return home.  The hitmen, determined not to lose their payoff, end up acting rashly and their carelessness leads to a confrontation in the hospital corridors, shooting it out with the police while Bob is caught up in the middle.  The hitmen start to turn on each other.  The wounded Bob tackles one, and during a struggle the two crash out of a window and fall to the ground.  The unconscious assassin is arrested.

As confusion and chaos rages in the hospital, one of the hitmen manages to slip away and takes the opportunity to enter Menda's temporarily unguarded room to perform a quick hit.  He discovers that Menda is far more ready for him than he could have anticipated.

Cast
 Richard Todd as Dr Bob McLaurin
 Betsy Drake as Dr Nancy Ferguson
 Herbert Lom as Juan Menda
 Warren Stevens as Finch
 Paul Carpenter as O'Brien
 Alexander Knox as Dr McNeil
 Lisa Gastoni as Carla Menda
 Carlo Giustini as Francisco Flores
 Peter Arne as Kral
 Catherine Boyle (Katie Boyle) as Margaret McLaurin
 John Crawford as Boyd
 Jackie Collins as Carol Freeman
 Kay Callard as Sally Gordon

See also
 Brian Moore's early fiction

References

External links 
 
 Intent to Kill at BFI Film & TV Database

1950s thriller films
1958 films
20th Century Fox films
British black-and-white films
British thriller films
1950s English-language films
Film noir
Films about presidents
Films based on Canadian novels
Films based on Irish novels
Films based on novels by Brian Moore
Films directed by Jack Cardiff
Films set in Montreal
Films shot at Associated British Studios
Films shot in Montreal
Films with screenplays by Jimmy Sangster
Films set in hospitals
1950s British films